Shawn Crable (born December 26, 1984) is a former professional American football linebacker. He played college football at Michigan and was drafted by the New England Patriots in the third round of the 2008 NFL Draft.

Crable was also a member of the New York Jets, Sacramento Mountain Lions and Hamilton Tiger-Cats.

Early years
Crable attended Washington High School and was a three-year letterman. As a senior, he made 75 tackles, 17 sacks, three forced fumbles and two interceptions and was a First-team All-State selection as a senior. He was also named to roster of 2003 U.S. Army All-American Bowl. He had 125 tackles, six sacks, 19 tackles for a loss and two interceptions as a junior. Additionally, he was four-year letterman in basketball and three-year letterman in track and field.

College career
Crable was a four-year letterman at the University of Michigan and was the team captain and Second-team All-American as a senior. As a freshman in 2003 was injured and missed entire season. In 2004, he played in nine games and contributed seven tackles, one tackle for loss, one sack and two pass breakups. In 2005, he played in and had 14 tackles, three tackles for loss, three sacks and three pass breakups. In 2006, he was Second-team All-Big Ten after starting eight games at outside linebacker (playing in all 13). He totaled 37 tackles with 10.5 tackles for loss and 4.5 sacks as well as three pass breakups, two forced fumbles and a fumble recovery. In 2007, he played in all 13 games and made 12 starts at outside linebacker and made 90 tackles with 28.5 tackles for a loss (TLFs). He also forced four fumbles and had one fumble recovery and one pass breakup. He was named second-team All-Big Ten Conference for the second consecutive season. His 28.5 TFLs led the Big Ten Conference, and it ranked second in the nation to George Selvie.

Professional career

Pre-draft

New England Patriots
Crable was drafted by the New England Patriots in the third round (78th overall) of the 2008 NFL Draft. Crable was inactive for the first half of 2008 and was placed injured reserve with a shin injury on November 5, 2008. He was placed on injured reserve on September 5, 2009 with a groin injury. He was released by the team on July 28, 2010, one day after being placed on the active/physically unable to perform list entering training camp. He was re-signed to the Patriots' practice squad on September 5, 2010. On September 25, 2010, Crable was promoted to the 53-man roster. He played in six games, recording four tackles and a half sack before being waived on November 16, 2010.

New York Jets
The New York Jets signed Crable to their practice squad on November 19, 2010.

Sacramento Mountain Lions
Crable was signed by the Sacramento Mountain Lions of the United Football League on August 29, 2011.

Hamilton Tiger-Cats
The Hamilton Tiger-Cats signed Crable on April 7, 2012. He was released soon after on May 17, 2012.

Post-retirement
Crable works as a fatherhood practitioner and hosts support groups for dads in the area where he grew up in Stark County, Ohio. He has six children.

References

External links
New York Jets bio
New England Patriots bio
NCAA stats
Just Sports Stats

1984 births
Living people
Sportspeople from Massillon, Ohio
Players of American football from Ohio
American football outside linebackers
Michigan Wolverines football players
New England Patriots players
New York Jets players
Sacramento Mountain Lions players
Hamilton Tiger-Cats players